The Royal Astronomical Society (RAS) is a learned society and charity that encourages and promotes the study of astronomy, solar-system science, geophysics and closely related branches of science. Its headquarters are in Burlington House, on Piccadilly in London. The society has over 4,000 members ("Fellows"), most of them professional researchers or postgraduate students. Around a quarter of Fellows live outside the UK.

The society holds monthly scientific meetings in London, and the annual National Astronomy Meeting at varying locations in the British Isles. The RAS publishes the scientific journals Monthly Notices of the Royal Astronomical Society, Geophysical Journal International and RAS Techniques and Instruments, along with the trade magazine Astronomy & Geophysics.

The RAS maintains an astronomy research library, engages in public outreach and advises the UK government on astronomy education. The society recognises achievement in astronomy and geophysics by issuing annual awards and prizes, with its highest award being the Gold Medal of the Royal Astronomical Society. The RAS is the UK adhering organisation to the International Astronomical Union and a member of the UK Science Council.

The society was founded in 1820 as the Astronomical Society of London to support astronomical research. At that time, most members were 'gentleman astronomers' rather than professionals. It became the Royal Astronomical Society in 1831 on receiving a Royal Charter from William IV. A Supplemental Charter in 1915 opened up the fellowship to women.

Publications

One of the major activities of the RAS is publishing refereed journals.  It publishes two primary research journals,  the Monthly Notices of the Royal Astronomical Society in astronomy and (in association with the Deutsche Geophysikalische Gesellschaft) the Geophysical Journal International in geophysics. It also publishes the magazine A&G which includes reviews and other articles of wide scientific interest in a 'glossy' format.  The full list of journals published (both currently and historically) by the RAS, with abbreviations as used for the NASA ADS bibliographic codes is:
 Memoirs of the Royal Astronomical Society (MmRAS): 1822–1977 
 Monthly Notices of the Royal Astronomical Society (MNRAS): 1827-present
 Geophysical Supplement to Monthly Notices (MNRAS): 1922–1957
 Geophysical Journal (GeoJ): 1958–1988
 Geophysical Journal International (GeoJI): 1989-present (volume numbering continues from GeoJ)
 Quarterly Journal of the Royal Astronomical Society (QJRAS): 1960–1996
 Astronomy & Geophysics (A&G): 1997-present (volume numbering continues from QJRAS)
 RAS Techniques & Instruments: 2021-present

Membership

Fellows  
Full members of the RAS are styled Fellows, and may use the post-nominal letters FRAS. Fellowship is open to anyone over the age of 18 who is considered acceptable to the society. As a result of the society's foundation in a time before there were many professional astronomers, no formal qualifications are required. However, around three quarters of fellows are professional astronomers or geophysicists. The society acts as the professional body for astronomers and geophysicists in the UK and fellows may apply for the Science Council's Chartered Scientist status through the society. The fellowship passed 3,000 in 2003.

Friends 
In 2009 an initiative was launched for those with an interest in astronomy and geophysics but without professional qualifications or specialist knowledge in the subject. Such people may join the Friends of the RAS, which offers popular talks, visits and social events.

Meetings 

The Society organises an extensive programme of meetings:

The biggest RAS meeting each year is the National Astronomy Meeting, a major conference of professional astronomers. It is held over 4-5 days each spring or early summer, usually at a university campus in the United Kingdom. Hundreds of astronomers attend each year.

More frequent smaller 'ordinary' meetings feature lectures about research topics in astronomy and geophysics, often given by winners of the society's awards. They are normally held in Burlington House in London on the afternoon of the second Friday of each month from October to May. The talks are intended to be accessible to a broad audience of astronomers and geophysicists, and are free for anyone to attend (not just members of the society). Formal reports of the meetings are published in The Observatory magazine.

Specialist discussion meetings are held on the same day as each ordinary meeting. These are aimed at professional scientists in a particular research field, and allow several speakers to present new results or reviews of scientific fields. Usually two discussion meetings on different topics (one in astronomy and one in geophysics) take place simultaneously at different locations within Burlington House, prior to the day's ordinary meeting. They are free for members of the society, but charge a small entry fee for non-members.

The RAS holds a regular programme of public lectures aimed at a general, non-specialist, audience. These are mostly held on Tuesdays once a month, with the same talk given twice: once at lunchtime and once in the early evening. The venues have varied, but are usually in Burlington House or another nearby location in central London. The lectures are free, though some popular sessions require booking in advance.

The society occasionally hosts or sponsors meetings in other parts of the United Kingdom, often in collaboration with other scientific societies and universities.

Library 

The Royal Astronomical Society has a more comprehensive collection of books and journals in astronomy and geophysics than the libraries of most universities and research institutions. The library receives some 300 current periodicals in astronomy and geophysics and contains more than 10,000 books from popular level to conference proceedings. Its collection of astronomical rare books is second only to that of the Royal Observatory in Edinburgh in the UK. The RAS library is a major resource not just for the society but also the wider community of astronomers, geophysicists, and historians.

Education 
The society promotes astronomy to members of the general public through their outreach pages for students, teachers, the public and media researchers. The RAS has an advisory role in relation to UK public examinations, such as GCSEs and A Levels.

Associated groups 
The RAS sponsors topical groups, many of them in interdisciplinary areas where the group is jointly sponsored by another learned society or professional body:
 The Astrobiology Society of Britain (with the NASA Astrobiology Institute)
 The Astroparticle Physics Group (with the Institute of Physics)
 The Astrophysical Chemistry Group (with the Royal Society of Chemistry)
 The British Geophysical Association (with the Geological Society of London)
 The Magnetosphere Ionosphere and Solar-Terrestrial group (generally known by the acronym MIST)
 The UK Planetary Forum
 The UK Solar Physics group

Presidents 

The first person to hold the title of President of the Royal Astronomical Society was William Herschel, though he never chaired a meeting, and since then the post has been held by many distinguished astronomers. The post has generally had a term of office of two years, but some holders resigned after one year e.g. due to poor health. Francis Baily and George Airy were elected a record four times each. Baily's eight years in the role are a record (Airy served for seven). Since 1876 no-one has served for more than two years in total.

The current president is Mike Edmunds, who began his term in May 2022 and will serve for two years.

Awards and prizes 

The highest award of the Royal Astronomical Society is its Gold Medal, which can be awarded for any purpose but most frequently recognises extraordinary lifetime achievement. Among the recipients best known to the general public are Albert Einstein in 1926, and Stephen Hawking in 1985.

Other awards are for particular topics in astronomy or geophysics research, which include the Eddington Medal, the Herschel Medal, the Chapman Medal and the Price Medal. Beyond research, there are specific awards for school teaching (Patrick Moore Medal), public outreach (Annie Maunder Medal), instrumentation (Jackson-Gwilt Medal) and history of science (Agnes Mary Clerke Medal). Lectureships include the Harold Jeffreys Lectureship in geophysics, the George Darwin Lectureship in astronomy, and the Gerald Whitrow Lectureship in cosmology. Each year, the society grants a handful of free memberships for life (termed honorary fellowship) to prominent researchers resident outside the UK.

Other activities 

The society occupies premises at Burlington House, London, where a library and meeting rooms are available to fellows and other interested parties.  The society represents the interests of astronomy and geophysics to UK national and regional, and European government and related bodies, and maintains a press office, through which it keeps the media and the public at large informed of developments in these sciences. The society allocates grants to worthy causes in astronomy and geophysics, and assists in the management of the Paneth Trust.

See also 
 National Astronomy Week (NAW)
 List of astronomical societies
 List of geoscience organizations

References

External links 

 The Royal Astronomical Society

 
Scientific organizations established in 1820
Learned societies of the United Kingdom
Astronomy organizations
Astronomy societies
Astronomy in the United Kingdom
Astronomical
Organisations based in London with royal patronage
1820 establishments in the United Kingdom